The periorbita is the area around the orbit. Sometimes it refers specifically to the layer of tissue surrounding the orbit that consists of periosteum. However, it may refer to anything that is around the orbit, such as in periorbital cellulitis.

References

 
Tissues (biology)
Human eye anatomy